See also, Elmdon, West Midlands.

Elmdon is a village in the Uttlesford district of Essex, England, near the boundary with Cambridgeshire and Hertfordshire. The hilly topography of the area differentiates it from countryside to the north, which is predominantly fenland and flat.

History 
The castle motte at Elmdon, known as 'castle hill', still exists. It was the Norman fortification of Robert de Lucy, brother to Richard de Lucy, Justiciar to King Stephen and Henry II. The church at Elmdon was granted by Robert de Lucy to Lesnes Abbey (founded by Richard de Lucy), around 1180. One mile to the west, at the highest point in Essex, Eustace de Boulogne (d.1125), father of Matilda of Boulogne (c.1103-1152), the future wife of King Stephen, built and occupied his moated house named 'Flanders' at Chrishall.

Elmdon has two Grade II* listed buildings: the church, which was, apart from the 15th Century tower, rebuilt in 1852 and 1879, likely on old foundations; and Pigots, an early 1500s moated manor house, which was home to the Mead family from 1554 to 1770.
The name Elmdon means 'hill of elms'. Elmdon includes a village hall, a church, and a recreation ground used for cricket and football.

Transport 
Elmdon has an infrequent bus service with links to Bishop's Stortford. There are three roads out of Elmdon; two are minor roads leading to other villages, and the third provides access indirectly to the nearest station, Audley End on the West Anglia Main Line.

Utilities
Elmdon is not served by mains gas; houses rely on individually supplied heating oil systems. The village is connected to British Telecom's backbone network through the Chrishall exchange which is ADSL-enabled. As of January 2007, speeds of up to 2mb ADSL and 3mb ADSL-MAX were available through broadband over copper phone cable. No cable television providers service the village.

Leisure 
Elmdon has sporting teams participating in local leagues. The village is a starting point for cross country running with trails of between 3 km and 30 km, some avoiding major roads. Tracks are passable on foot and bicycle between March and November, becoming waterlogged outside this range (passable but not to run on).

The Icknield Way Path passes through the village on its  journey from Ivinghoe Beacon in Buckinghamshire to Knettishall Heath in Suffolk. The multi-user route is open for walkers, horse riders and off-road cyclists.

See also
The Hundred Parishes

References

External links

 Elmdon village history
Elmdon Parish Church Picture taken by Ian Rose in 1999
The Icknield Way Parish (includes Elmdon)
The Elmdon Dial sundial
Elmdon Village Website

Villages in Essex
Uttlesford